Military Heritage is an American glossy, bi-monthly military history magazine that was first published in August 1999 by Sovereign Media. It was founded by Carl A. Gnam, Jr., who also serves as the editorial director. The current magazine editor is William Welsh. The magazine is headquartered in Reston, Virginia.

The feature articles focus on historical battles or campaigns, and describe the context in which the conflict was fought. They will typically include several illustrations and a brief bibliography for further reading. There can also be articles on military leaders, weapons, eyewitness accounts, and other war-related topics. The articles cover a diverse range of historical periods and conflicts. The magazine also includes an editorial page and brief reviews of history books and simulations. The illustrations include maps, museum artwork, and, when available, photographs.

References

External links
 Magazine web site
 Military Heritage: The Internet Magazine - Started in 1995, this on-line publication is of a similar name. The two often get confused.

History magazines published in the United States
Bimonthly magazines published in the United States
Magazines established in 1999
Military magazines published in the United States
Magazines published in Virginia
1999 establishments in Virginia